Deutscher Spielverein Saaz (DSV Saaz), also known as DSV Žatec, was a football club from the town of Žatec. The club was a member of the German Football Association in Czechoslovakia but played one season in the Czechoslovak First League. The club's single top-flight season was the 1935–36 Czechoslovak First League, finishing last among 14 teams, conceding 92 goals in 26 matches. The club disbanded in 1945.

References

Further reading
 

Football clubs in Czechoslovakia
Association football clubs disestablished in 1945
Czechoslovak First League clubs
Defunct football clubs in the Czech Republic
Defunct football clubs in former German territories
German association football clubs outside Germany
Louny District